Rhett Walker Band is a Southern rock and Christian rock band from Nashville. The band released their debut studio album under the Essential Records label on July 10, 2012 called Come to the River. The band's debut single, "When Mercy Found Me", achieved placement on Christian music charts.

Rhett Walker Band announced they were discontinuing in 2016. In 2017, Walker re-signed with Essential Records.

Background
Rhett Walker Band frontman Rhett Walker is a preacher's kid from Aiken, South Carolina. The band formed in 2011 and consisted of Rhett Walker as well as Kenny Davis who played drums, the guitarist Joe Kane, and bassist Kevin Whitsett.

The band released their debut single "When Mercy Found Me" on April 23, 2012, and reached No.5 on the Christian AC Indicator & AC Monitored chart September 2012. This song was written by Rhett Walker and Jeff Pardo. "When Mercy Found Me" was nominated for a Grammy on Wednesday, December 5, 2012 for Best Contemporary Christian Music Song.

The band's debut album Come to the River released on July 10, 2012 by Essential Records. Walker said they wrote 50 songs while coming up with songs for the record.

The band's second album, Here's to the Ones, was released on October 14, 2014 through Essential Records.

Discography

Albums

EPs

Singles

Awards
GMA Dove Awards

 Grammys

Notes

References

External links
 
 WEQP Interview

Musical groups established in 2011
Essential Records (Christian) artists
Christian rock groups from Tennessee
2011 establishments in Tennessee